Veronella is a comune (municipality) in the Province of Verona in the Italian region Veneto, located about  west of Venice and about  southeast of Verona.

The municipality of Veronella contains the frazione (subdivision) San Gregorio.

Veronella borders the following municipalities: Albaredo d'Adige, Arcole, Belfiore, Bonavigo, Cologna Veneta, Minerbe, Pressana, and Zimella.

Demographic evolution

See also
 breach at Cucca

References

Cities and towns in Veneto